Maurizio D'Achille (7 April 1932 – 31 May 2013) was an Italian water polo player who competed in the 1956 Summer Olympics. In 1956 he was a member of the Italian team which finished fourth in the Olympic tournament. He played two matches. He was born in Rome.

References

1932 births
2013 deaths
Italian male water polo players
Olympic water polo players of Italy
Water polo players at the 1956 Summer Olympics
Water polo players from Rome
20th-century Italian people